Chintrapalli  is a village in the southern state of Karnataka, India. It is located in the Hagaribommanahalli taluk of Bellary district in Karnataka.

Demographics
 India census, Chintrapalli had a population of 20558 with 10523 males and 10035 females.

See also
 Bellary
 Districts of Karnataka

References

External links
 http://Bellary.nic.in/

Villages in Bellary district